Halosarpheia is a genus of fungi in the family Halosphaeriaceae. The genus contains 22 species.

References

Sordariomycetes genera
Microascales